Vaughan—Woodbridge is a federal electoral district in Ontario, Canada. It covers the Woodbridge neighbourhood, previously included in the electoral district of Vaughan.

Demographics
''According to the Canada 2021 Census; 2013 representation

Ethnic groups: 65.7% White, 10.2% South Asian, 4% Chinese, 3.5% Latin American, 3.1% Southeast Asian, 3.1% West Asian, 3% Black, 1.9% Arab, 1.7% Filipino
Languages: 46.9% English, 18.8% Italian, 3% Spanish, 2.3% Punjabi, 1.9% Vietnamese, 1.8% Mandarin, 1.6% Portuguese, 1.4% Russian, 1.2% Arab, 1.1% Yue. 1% Tamil
Religions: 72.9% Christian (60.5% Catholic, 3.9% Christian Orthodox, 1% Pentecostal and other Charismatic), 11.5% No religion, 4.9% Muslim, 4.7% Hindu, 2.7% Sikh, 2.5% Buddhist 
Median income (2020): $42,400 
Average income (2020): $60,750

In 2021, the riding has the second-highest percentage of Italian Canadians in all of Canada (46.7%).

History

Vaughan—Woodbridge was first proposed as part of the 2012 electoral district redistribution. It would contain the City of Vaughan west of Highway 400 and south of the concession line which Major Mackenzie Drive follows. It was legally defined in the 2013 representation order with no changes and came into effect upon the dropping of the writs for the 2015 federal election.

Members of Parliament

This riding has elected the following Members of Parliament:

Election results

References

Ontario federal electoral districts
Politics of Vaughan
2013 establishments in Ontario